Delos oualanensis is a species of air-breathing land snails, terrestrial pulmonate gastropod mollusks in the family Rhytididae.

This species is endemic to Micronesia.

References

Fauna of Micronesia
Rhytididae
Taxa named by William Harper Pease
Taxonomy articles created by Polbot